In college football, 2003 NCAA football bowl games may refer to:

 2002–03 NCAA football bowl games, for games played in January 2003 as part of the 2002 season.
 2003–04 NCAA football bowl games, for games played in December 2003 as part of the 2003 season.